Serena (Szeréna) Pulitzer Lederer (20 May 1867 in  – 27 March 1943 ) was the spouse of the industrial magnate August Lederer, close friend of Gustav Klimt and instrumental in the constitution of the collection of Klimt's art pieces.

Early life 
Born in Budapest into a wealthy Jewish family (a relative of the U.S. journalist Joseph Pulitzer), Serena was known for being a beauty in her youth and later a Grande Dame. She married on 5 June 1892 at the Rabbinat of Pest, August Lederer.
The family was resident of Raab (Győr), in the Bartensteingasse n° 8 in Vienna and at the castle Ledererschlössel in Weidlingau.

Art 
In Vienna, one room of the flat was dedicated to Klimt works.
The painting of Szeréna Lederer done in 1899 was the origin of a close friendship. On Klimt's recommendation, in 1912,  Egon Schiele was introduced to the Lederer family and became friends with Erich Lederer, the youngest son.
Szeréna Lederer was instrumental in the collection of Klimt's work. There are portraits of her mother Charlotte Pulitzer, her daughter Elisabeth Bachofen-Echt  and herself by the artist. 
It has been suggested Elisabeth was the biological daughter of Lederer and Klimt.

Nazi persecution 
The Lederer collection was confiscated from Serena in 1940 and she fled to Budapest, where she died three years later. The Gestapo transferred the collection to Immendorf Castle, but the castle was set on fire in May, 1945 so that it would not fall into the hands of the Allies and the collection was destroyed. However it is not certain that all the artworks had actually been consumed in the fire as there are reports that some of them reappeared after the war.

See also 

 Vugesta
 The Holocaust in Austria
 List of Claims for Restitution for Nazi-looted art

Bibliography 
 Tobias Natter, Gerbert Frodl (Hsg.): Klimt und die Frauen (Ausstellungskatalog), Dumont Köln 2000

References

1867 births
1943 deaths
Art Nouveau
Austrian art collectors
Jewish art collectors
Women art collectors